Calliostoma melliferum  is a species of sea snail, a marine gastropod mollusk in the family Calliostomatidae.

Description
The shell of Calliostoma melliferum is relatively small for a species in the genus Calliostoma, with maximum height ranging from 8 mm to 10 mm.

Distribution
This species is only known  from Canopus Bank, a seamount off the northeastern coast of Brazil, at depths between 60 m and 260 m.

References

melliferum
Gastropods described in 2018